Edward Joseph Michaels (born Mikolajewski) (June 11, 1914 – January 21, 1976) was an American football guard in the National Football League (NFL) for the Chicago Bears, the Washington Redskins, and the Philadelphia Eagles. He was drafted in the second round of the 1936 NFL Draft. He also played for the Wilmington Clippers from 1938 to 1942, and 1947. From 1948 to 1950 he played in the CFL for the Ottawa Rough Riders. Michaels also played on the "Steagles", a merged team consisting of the Eagles and Pittsburgh Steelers in 1943. The team was the result of a league-wide manning shortage brought on by World War II. Many of the "Steagles" players were labeled 4-F's, those deemed physically unfit due to ailments such as ulcers, flat feet and even partial blindness. Michaels was labeled a 4F because he was nearly deaf.

He played college football at Villanova University and was drafted in the second round of the 1936 NFL Draft.

In 1976, he was inducted into the Delaware Sports Museum and Hall of Fame.

References

External links
Steagles: When the Steelers and Eagles were One in the Same

1914 births
1976 deaths
American football offensive guards
Villanova Wildcats football players
Chicago Bears players
Washington Redskins players
Philadelphia Eagles players
Steagles players and personnel
Players of American football from Wilmington, Delaware
Salesianum School alumni
Wilmington Clippers players
Wilmington Football League players